Morihiro (written: , ,  or ) is a masculine Japanese given name. Notable people with the name include:

, Japanese darts player
, Japanese prince
, Japanese politician
, Japanese aikidoka

Japanese masculine given names